The River Oich is a short river that flows through the Great Glen in Scotland. It carries water from Loch Oich (to the SW) to Loch Ness (to the NE) and runs in parallel to a section of the Caledonian Canal for the whole of its  length. The Great Glen Way runs between the two watercourses. The river's largest tributary is the Invigar Burn. The only significant settlement on the river is Fort Augustus at its NE end.

References

External links

Oich
2Oich